WFSF may refer to:

 WFSF-LD, a low-power television station (channel 10) licensed to serve Key West, Florida, United States
 World Futures Studies Federation